Karen Jensen is an American actress.

Biography
Born in San Francisco, Jensen is the daughter of Charles and Claire Jensen. She was the youngest person to win the Miss San Carlos title. After she participated in other pageants, she became a model and was photographed for billboard advertising for Granny Goose Potato Chips. A William Morris Agency talent scout saw her in the Miss California pageant, and after she passed a screen test she received a Warner Bros. contract.

Jensen's acting debut came in 1965 in the television situation comedy Wendy and Me. She performed on some other TV shows before leaving Warner Bros. and going to Universal. Her film debut came in Out of Sight (1966).

Jensen was married to actor John Neilson After their divorce, she married actor Michael Stroka in 1990. Following his death, she married actor Brendon Boone.

Selected filmography

References

External links
 
 
 Short biography

Living people
Actresses from San Francisco
20th-century American actresses
21st-century American women
Year of birth missing (living people)